The 4722d Air Defense Group is a discontinued United States Air Force organization. Its last assignment was with the 27th Air Division at George Air Force Base, California, where it was discontinued in 1958.

The group was formed to provide a single command and support organization for the two fighter interceptor squadrons of Air Defense Command (ADC), that were tenants at George, a Tactical Air Command (TAC) base.  It was discontinued when the 327th Fighter-Interceptor Squadron was scheduled to move in 1958, leaving only a single ADC fighter squadron at George.

History
The group was established as the 4722d Air Defense Group to provide a headquarters for Air Defense Command (ADC) Fighter-Interceptor Squadrons (FIS) stationed at George Air Force Base, California, a Tactical Air Command Base. TAC's 479th Air Base Group (until July 1957) and 839th Air Base Group (after July 1957) acted as host base organizations for the group. The 4722d was assigned the 327th FIS, flying radar equipped and air-to-air missile–armed Convair F-102 Delta Dagger aircraft, and 329th FIS, flying North American F-86 Sabre aircraft which were also radar equipped but armed with Mighty Mouse rockets, as its operational components. The 329th FIS upgraded to newer model F-86s in the spring of 1957 which, like the 327th's F-102s, were equipped with data link to tie them in to the Semi-Automatic Ground Environment command and control system. The group was discontinued when the 327th FIS was scheduled to move to Thule AB, Greenland in July 1958, leaving only a single operational ADC squadron at George. Its squadrons were then assigned directly to the 27th Air Division.

Lineage
 Designated as 4722d Air Defense Group  and organized on 1 December 1956
 Discontinued on 25 June 1958

Assignments
 27th Air Division, 1 December 1956 – 25 June 1958

Components
 327th Fighter-Interceptor Squadron, 1 December 1956 – 25 June 1958
 329th Fighter-Interceptor Squadron, 1 December 1956 – 25 June 1958

Stations
 George Air Force Base, California, 1 December 1956 – 25 June 1958

Aircraft
 F-86D 1956–1957
 F-86L 1956–1957
 F-102A 1956–1958

Commanders
 Lt Col. Harris F. Krause, unknown – 25 June 1958

See also
 List of United States Air Force Aerospace Defense Command Interceptor Squadrons
 List of Sabre and Fury units in the US military

References

Notes

Bibliography

Further reading
 

Air defense groups of the United States Air Force
Four digit groups of the United States Air Force
Aerospace Defense Command units
Military units and formations established in 1956
Military units and formations in California
Military units and formations disestablished in 1958
1956 establishments in California
1958 disestablishments in California